Judenau-Baumgarten is a market town in the district of Tulln in the Austrian state of Lower Austria.

Population

References

External links

Cities and towns in Tulln District